Tang Miao (born 16 October 1990 in Dalian) is a Chinese footballer who currently plays for Guangzhou R&F in the Chinese Super League.

Club career
Born in Dalian, Tang moved to Beijing and joined Beijing Guoan youth team at the age of twelve along with twin elder brother Tang Xin in 2002. He was loaned to Beijing's satellite team Beijing Guoan Talent, which would play as a foreign team in Singapore's S. League in the 2010 season. On 7 September 2010, the club was involved in a brawl during a match with Young Lions at Jalan Besar Stadium. Tang was fined S$2,000 by the Football Association of Singapore for participating the brawl. He was released by Beijing Guoan at the end of the season.

After an unsuccessful trial at Shenzhen Ruby, Tang was signed by Shenzhen Phoenix, which later changed its club name to Guangzhou R&F, in March 2011. His debut for the club came on 27 March 2011 in a 1–1 home draw against Shenyang Dongjin. He made 17 appearances in the 2011 league season as Guangzhou R&F finished second place in the second division and won promotion back to the top flight at the first attempt. On 23 June 2012, he scored his first senior goal in a 3–2 home defeat against Qingdao Jonoon. On 13 July 2015, Tang suffered a rupture of anterior cruciate ligament in his left knee in a league match against Shanghai SIPG, ruling him out for the rest of the season. He made his return on 23 April 2016 in a 1–1 home draw against Jiangsu Suning. He scored one goal in 25 league appearances in the 2016 season and extended his contract with the club for five years on 25 November 2016. 

On 28 April 2017, he played against Tang Xin in a league match against Guizhou Zhicheng, which marked the first time twin brothers had played for opposing teams in the Chinese Super League.

By September 2018, Tang had played 200 games - primarily as a right back or right wing back - for Guangzhou R&F. By August 2019 he had played 200 league games for Guangzhou R&F.

International career
On 23 May 2012, Tang received his first call up for China for the international friendly against Spain and Vietnam. On 8 June, he made his debut for China in a 3–0 victory against Vietnam, coming on as a substitute for Yu Hai in the 87th minute.

Career statistics
Statistics accurate as of match played 31 December 2020.

References

External links
 
 

1990 births
Living people
Chinese footballers
Footballers from Dalian
Guangzhou City F.C. players
Singapore Premier League players
Chinese Super League players
China League One players
China international footballers
Association football defenders
Twin sportspeople
Chinese twins